Dyshawn Pierre (born November 17, 1993) is a Canadian professional basketball player for Fenerbahçe of the Turkish Turkish Basketball Super League (BSL) and the EuroLeague. He is from Whitby, Ontario and played college basketball for the Dayton Flyers.

Early life
Pierre was born in Whitby, Ontario. In high school, Pierre led the Anderson Raiders to back-to-back OFSAA championships in 2011 and 2012.

College career
He averaged 13 points and 8 rebounds in his second season as a 6'6' shooting guard for the Dayton Flyers. In the 2014 NCAA Men's Division 1 basketball tournament, Pierre's free throw shooting in the final minute of the opening game helped the Flyers (11 seed) upset Ohio State University (6 seed).  Pierre also hit three of four free throws in the final minutes of the second round game against the Syracuse Orangemen (a 3 seed) to put the Flyers in the sweet sixteen.  Dayton went on to beat Stanford, but lost to the Florida Gators in the elite eight, where Pierre scored 18 points.

Dyshawn Pierre was chosen as an All-Atlantic 10 Conference Second Team Selection. As a junior playing as a starter in the guard position, Pierre appeared in the "First Four" game held at The University of Dayton Arena that opened the 2015 NCAA Men's Division 1 basketball tournament.  He scored nine points  in a close come-back win for the Dayton Flyers against the Boise State Broncos to earn a place in the 64 team tournament. Comically, he found his shorts around his ankles  after retrieving one of his six rebounds in the middle of the second half.  In the second game of the tournament, Pierre scored 20 points, leading the Flyers over the sixth-seeded Providence Friars for an upset win, 66-53. Notably, Pierre spun inside with two minutes to play, put the ball in the hoop, and sank the "and one" foul shot.

Pierre was accused of sexual assault which was alleged to have occurred on April 23, 2015 and was reported to the University of Dayton in May. Pierre denied the allegations, stating that the sex was consensual. The Montgomery County, Ohio prosecutor's office declined to press charges against the basketball player, citing insufficient evidence. Nonetheless, the University of Dayton suspended Pierre for the fall semester, meaning he would be eligible to play basketball on December 22. He hired a lawyer to fight the suspension.

Professional career 
Coming out of college, Pierre made the summer league roster of the Indiana Pacers. In late August 2016, he signed his first overseas contract with Basketball Löwen Braunschweig of the German Basketball Bundesliga. Grabbing 7.9 boards a contest, he led the German league in rebounding in the 2016-17 season and also averaged 14.9 points per outing.

Pierre signed with Italian side Dinamo Basket Sassari for the 2017-18 campaign.

On July 8, 2020, he signed with EuroLeague side Fenerbahçe Beko of the Turkish Basketball Super League (BSL). Pierre averaged 9.1 points and 3.3 rebounds per game. He signed a three-year contract with the team on June 14, 2021.

The Basketball Tournament (TBT) (2017–present) 
In the summer of 2017, Pierre played in The Basketball Tournament on ESPN for the Broad Street Brawlers.  He competed for the $2 million prize, and for the Brawlers, he averaged 20.5 points per game along with shooting 52 percent behind the free-throw line.  Pierre helped the Brawlers reach the second round of the tournament, only then losing to Team Colorado 111-95.

National team career
Pierre has played with Canada Basketball on the Cadet team (2010) and Junior team (2011), winning bronze with teammates like Andrew Wiggins, Kevin Pangos, Anthony Bennett and Olivier Hanlan.

References

1993 births
Living people
Basketball Löwen Braunschweig players
Basketball people from Ontario
Black Canadian basketball players
Canadian expatriate basketball people in Germany
Canadian expatriate basketball people in Italy
Canadian expatriate basketball people in Turkey
Canadian expatriate basketball people in the United States
Canadian men's basketball players
Dayton Flyers men's basketball players
Dinamo Sassari players
Fenerbahçe men's basketball players
Lega Basket Serie A players
Shooting guards
Small forwards
Sportspeople from Whitby, Ontario